The 1952–53 Hovedserien was the 9th completed season of top division football in Norway.

Overview
16 teams competed. Larvik Turn & IF won the championship, their first league title.

Teams and locations
''Note: Table lists in alphabetical order.

League tables

Group A

Group B

Results

Group A

Group B

Championship final
Larvik Turn 3–2 Skeid

References
Norway – List of final tables (RSSSF)

Eliteserien seasons
Norway
1
1